Marchetta is an Italian surname. Notable people with the surname include:

Camille Marchetta (born 1940), American novelist, television writer, and producer
Melina Marchetta (born 1965), Australian writer and teacher

Italian-language surnames